Julio Tejeda (born 31 July 1971) is a retired Swiss football midfielder.

References

1971 births
Living people
Swiss people of Spanish descent
Swiss men's footballers
FC Sion players
FC Monthey players
FC St. Gallen players
FC Zürich players
FC Lugano players
Étoile Carouge FC players
Association football midfielders
Swiss Super League players